Gabriel Oyola (born 25 September 1982 in Argentina) is an Argentinean retired footballer.

References

1982 births
Living people
Association football defenders
Argentine footballers
Talleres de Córdoba footballers
Parma Calcio 1913 players
Ferro Carril Oeste footballers
Sportivo Las Parejas footballers
Sportivo Italiano footballers
Olimpo footballers